is a train station in the city of Nakatsugawa, Gifu Prefecture, Japan, operated by the Third-sector railway operator Akechi Railway.

Lines

Station layout
Iinuma Station has one side platform serving a single bi-directional track. The station is unattended.

Adjacent stations

|-
!colspan=5|Akechi Railway

History
Iinuma Station opened on October 28, 1991.

Surrounding area
The station is located in an isolated rural area.

See also
 List of Railway Stations in Japan

External links

 

Railway stations in Japan opened in 1991
Railway stations in Gifu Prefecture
Stations of Akechi Railway
Nakatsugawa, Gifu